Valerie Taylor may refer to:

 Valerie Taylor (actress) (1902–1988), English actress
 Valerie Taylor (novelist) (1913–1997), American author of books published in the Lesbian pulp fiction genre
 Valerie Taylor (diver) (born 1935), Australian underwater diver and shark expert
 Valerie Ann Taylor (born 1944), British-born Bangladeshi philanthropist, founder of the Center for the Rehabilitation of the Paralyzed (CRP)
 Valerie Taylor (computer scientist) (born 1963), African American computer scientist